The Miltogramminae are a subfamily of the family Sarcophagidae. They are kleptoparasites of  solitary bees and solitary wasps (not eusocial species).

Genera

Aenigmetopia Malloch, 1930
Alusomyia Villeneuve, 1933
Ambouya Villeneuve, 1935
Amobia Robineau-Desvoidy, 1830
Apodacra Macquart, 1854
Beludzhia Rohdendorf, 1935
Chaetapodacra Rohdendorf, 1935
Chivamyia Pape, 1996
Chorezmomyia Rohdendorf, 1935
Craticulina Bezzi, 1906
Dolichotachina Villeneuve, 1913
Eremasiomyia Rohdendorf, 1927
Eumacronychia Townsend, 1892
Euphyto Townsend, 1908
Gymnoprosopa Townsend, 1892
Gymnopsidia Shewell, 1987
Hoplacephala Macquart, 1846
Khowaba Pape, 1991
Lamprometopia Macquart, 1846
Macronychia Rondani, 1859
Medomyia Rohdendorf, 1926
Mesomelena Rondani, 1859
Metopia Meigen, 1803
Metopodia Brauer & von Bergenstamm, 1889
Miltogramma Meigen, 1803
Oebalia Robineau-Desvoidy, 1863
Opsidia Coquillett, 1895
Phrosinella Robineau-Desvoidy, 1863
Phylloteles Loew, 1844
Protomiltogramma Townsend, 1912
Pterella Robineau-Desvoidy, 1863
Senotainia Macquart, 1846
Sphecapatoclea Villeneuve, 1909
Sphecapatodes Villeneuve, 1912
Sphenometopa Townsend, 1908
Taxigramma Perris, 1852
Xiphidiella Zumpt, 1852

References

External links
Sarcoweb Biology

Sarcophagidae
Brachycera subfamilies